Proportional fairness may refer to:
Proportional division - a division of a resource among  partners such that each partner receives a part worth for him at least  of the whole.
Proportional-fair rule - a rule for selecting between alternatives. Aims to attain a balance between efficiency and fairness.
Proportional-fair scheduling - a network scheduling algorithm based on similar principles.
Proportional representation in electoral systems.